Jack O'Connell may refer to:

 Jack O'Connell (actor) (born 1990), English actor
 Jack O'Connell (Australian politician) (1903–1972), member of the Victorian Legislative Council
 Jack O'Connell (diplomat) (1921–2010), American diplomat and CIA Station chief in Amman, Jordan, 1963–1971
 Jack O'Connell (filmmaker) (1923–2019), American director of the 1968 film Revolution
 Jack O'Connell (English footballer) (born 1994), English footballer
 Jack O'Connell (Australian footballer) (1902–1975), Australian rules footballer
 Jack O'Connell (American politician) (born 1951), American politician
 Jack O'Connell (rugby union) (born 1990), Irish rugby union player
 Jack O'Connell (author) (born 1959), American novelist

See also
 John O'Connell (disambiguation)